The Legislative Assembly of Kemerovo Oblast — Kuzbass (Parliament of Kuzbass), formerly the Council of People's Deputies of Kemerovo Oblast until 2019, is the regional parliament of Kemerovo Oblast, a federal subject of Russia. A total of 46 deputies are elected for five-year terms.

Elections

2018

Notes

References

Kemerovo Oblast
Politics of Kemerovo Oblast